Jean-Baptiste-Louis-Jacques-Joseph Rousseau, most often called Jean-Baptiste Rousseau or Joseph Rousseau, (10 December 1780 – 22 February 1831) was an early 19th-century French orientalist.

He was the son of Jean-François Rousseau or Rousseau of Persia (1753-1808), consul of France in Basra and Baghdad and Anne-Marie Sahid. Jean-Baptiste Rousseau, married with Élisabeth Outrey, was himself consul in Basra in 1805, consul général in Aleppo and to the Tripoli Eyalet (1808).

Works 
1809: Description du pachalik de Bagdad, suivi d'une Notice historique sur les Wahabis
1813: Itinéraire de Perse par la voie de Bagdad
1817: Mélanges d’histoire et de littérature orientales
1818: Mémoire sur trois plus fameuses sectes du musulmanisme, les Wahabis, les Nosaïris et les Ismaélis
1818: Notice historique sur la Perse ancienne et moderne

Sources 
 France-Iran : quatre cents ans de dialogue, by Florence Hellot-Bellier, Studia Iranica, Cahier 34, 2007, Paris.

External links 
 Jean-Baptiste-Louis-Jacques Rousseau on data.bnf.fr

French orientalists
Translators from Persian
French Iranologists
People from Val-de-Marne
1780 births
1831 deaths
Ambassadors of France to Iran
Ambassadors of France to the Ottoman Empire
19th-century translators